The year 2001 is the ninth year in the history of Pancrase, a mixed martial arts promotion based in Japan. In 2001 Pancrase held 13 events beginning with Pancrase: Proof 1.

Title fights

Events list

Pancrase: Proof 1

Pancrase: Proof 1 was an event held on February 4, 2001 at the Aomori Prefectural Gymnasium in Aomori, Japan.

Results

Pancrase Australia: Hybrid Evolution

Pancrase Australia: Hybrid Evolution was an event held on February 17, 2001 at Korakuen Hall in Tokyo, Japan.

Results

Pancrase: Proof 2

Pancrase: Proof 2 was an event held on March 31, 2001 at Clancy Centre in Sydney, Australia.

Results

Pancrase: 2001 Neo-Blood Tournament Eliminations

Pancrase: 2001 Neo-Blood Tournament Eliminations was an event held on May 5, 2001 at the Namihaya Dome in Kadoma, Osaka, Japan.

Results

Pancrase: Proof 3

Pancrase: Proof 3 was an event held on May 13, 2001 at the Ota City Gymnasium in Tokyo, Japan.

Results

Pancrase: Proof 4

Pancrase: Proof 4 was an event held on June 26, 2001 at Korakuen Hall in Tokyo, Japan.

Results

Pancrase: 2001 Neo-Blood Tournament Opening Round

Pancrase: 2001 Neo-Blood Tournament Opening Round was an event held on July 29, 2001 at Korakuen Hall in Tokyo, Japan.

Results

Pancrase: 2001 Neo-Blood Tournament Second Round

Pancrase: 2001 Neo-Blood Tournament Second Round was an event held on July 29, 2001 at Korakuen Hall in Tokyo, Japan.

Results

Pancrase: Proof 5

Pancrase: Proof 5 was an event held on August 25, 2001 at Korakuen Hall in Tokyo, Japan.

Results

Pancrase: 2001 Anniversary Show

Pancrase: 2001 Anniversary Show was an event held on September 30, 2001 at Umeda Stella Hall in Osaka, Osaka, Japan.

Results

Pancrase: Australia

Pancrase: Australia was an event held on October 16, 2001 at the Yokohama Cultural Gymnasium in Yokohama, Kanagawa, Japan.

Results

Pancrase: Proof 6

Pancrase: Proof 6 was an event held on October 30, 2001 at Korakuen Hall in Tokyo, Japan.

Results

Pancrase: Proof 7

Pancrase: Proof 7 was an event held on December 1, 2001 at the Yokohama Cultural Gymnasium in Yokohama, Kanagawa, Japan.

Results

See also 
 Pancrase
 List of Pancrase champions
 List of Pancrase events

References

Pancrase events
2001 in mixed martial arts